Fetch TV is an Australian IPTV provider that delivers a subscription television service over a user's regular internet service. Fetch TV launched in 2010 backed by its Malaysian parent Astro Malaysia Holdings. On 2 August 2022, Telstra acquired a 51% stake in the company.

Fetch TV provides a set top box with a digital TV tuner, personal video recorder and up to 45 subscription channels, video on demand, pay per view movies, web applications, and a mobile app.

The service is delivered by HLS adaptive bitrate streaming. The minimum internet sync speed required varies by ISP delivery method. The majority of Fetch TV content is unmetered when delivered over a broadband connection from a Fetch TV ISP partner.

History
On 25 May 2010, Fetch TV announced they would begin offering their first generation set top box PVRs through partner iiNet. This featured three digital tuners to receive Australian terrestrial channels, as well as fourteen linear subscription channels and six Video on Demand based channels. On 21 July they added five international news channels to the subscription channel package. On 6 August they added the WarnerTV SVOD service.

Fox Sports News was added on 27 August 2010, and by 14 February 2011, Fetch had Chelsea TV, Man City TV, Barcelona TV, Man Utd TV and Real Madrid TV.

The Ovation channel and Setanta Sports were added soon after, with Setanta later being rolled out as a $15/month add-on to the basic subscription package. The Travel Channel was added 15 September 2011, and Optus began on-selling the service.

Syfy was added in 2014 and from February 1, 2015, the subscription channel pack was completely revamped, with nine new channels added including ESPN and BBC and six channels removed. When Setanta Sports was purchased by the Al Jazeera Media Network in 2014 the channel was rebranded as beIN Sports (Australia).

On 16 February 2015, they announced plans to become the first Australian pay-TV provider to integrate the Netflix service into its platform, allowing users with a separate Netflix subscription to access Netflix content through the Fetch TV set-top box. In March 2016 it was announced Optus would add its Optus Sport channels showing the English Premier League to the service, available only to Optus customers, and on 15 June 2016 they announced their third generation boxes: the 4k-capable Mighty and the puck-like Mini. This announcement included the addition of Spike to the channel pack and the planned additions of the Presto and 9Now apps to the service. Their press release from the event also hinted at a future catch-up service for content available on the entertainment pack channels.

In 2016, they began trialling HD and broadcast ESPN, beIN Sports (Australia) and Optus Sport in minimum 720p, and customers with the third generation boxes reported that they were receiving BBC First and BBC Knowledge in HD.

 27 February 2017 – Fetch launched their new channel packs, splitting their available channels into 4 groups and allowing them to be purchased separately or as a bundle. They also confirmed that a number of the channels will be delivered in HD, with 'more improvements to come in the next 60 days'.
 October 2016 – the next generation of their mobile app was launched
 July 2017 – Fetch became the 'Official Broadcaster of the UFC' in Australia, offering pay-per-view fights at $54.95 AUD and other content broadcast through their exclusive 'Edge Sport HD' channel.
 August 2018 – Fetch added the remaining BeIN Sports (Australia) channels 2 & 3. 
 10 October 2019 - BBC Earth was launched as part of BBC's global rollout, with a live channel and on-demand content. It replaced BBC Knowledge.

Models and features
Fetch TV offers two set-top boxes, the Mighty and the Mini. Both boxes receive all Free-to-Air Australian television channels via antenna connections, as well as offering the subscription packages via IPTV. Both boxes contain apps such as Netflix and Stan which require external subscriptions, as well as apps such as the Seven Sport 'Olympicson7' and '7CommGames' apps. The boxes connect when using the same network, and registered to the same account, allowing for "multi-room" functionality, such as using the Mini in another room to watch recorded programs from a connected Mighty device.

Fetch Mighty
The Mighty has an RRP of $449 AUD (previously $399). It can support resolutions up to UHD 3840 x 2160, and has a 1TB hard drive for recording live television and storing downloaded content. It has 4 TV tuners to support simultaneous recording and can record multiple multiplex channels at once using the same tuner.

Fetch Mini
The Mini has an RRP of $169 AUD. It can support resolutions up to HD 1920 x 1080, and has 4GB flash memory for pausing live television. It has 1 TV tuner.

Availability
Fetch TV can be purchased at retailers JB Hi-Fi, The Good Guys, Bing Lee, Harvey Norman, Joyce Mayne and Domayne and through Australian ISP's (Internet Service Providers) such as Optus, Dodo, iPrimus, iiNet and its subsidiaries Internode, Westnet, Adam Internet, Aussie Broadband and TransACT. Fetch TV boxes can also be purchased directly from Fetch via their eBay presence.

In 2016 TPG announced that they would abandon their own plans for an IPTV service and begin selling FetchTV.

Subscriber base
Fetch TV Australia faced significant opposition in the market place from competitors such as Foxtel and Telstra TV leading to comments by mainstream technology and financial media sources in 2014 that the service needs to ramp up its subscriber base to progress. In response the company said in 2013 it has strategies in place to produce success and increase its subscription base significantly.

In early 2016 it was revealed the service had 400,000 active subscribers and were aiming for 600,000 by the end of the year. This goal was reached in late 2017, with Fetch citing the growth of Australia's National Broadband Network as a key driver. On the back of the NBN, Fetch added an average 20,000 customers per month in 2017.

The service operates an industry TV ratings app which gives an indication which boxes are subscribed at any one time and which channels have what share of their audience.

Subscription channels

Fetch TV has broadcast rights to channels from Paramount Networks, BBC Studios, NBCUniversal & Warner Bros. Discovery.

, the following Fetch Channel Packages are offered:

Kids (7 channels)

Knowledge (18 channels)

Vibe (10 channels)

Variety (10 channels)
Discovery Turbo 
Investigation Discovery 
CMT
Oxygen1
Universal TV3
BBC First
BBC UKTV
TLC
MTV Classic
Stingray CMusic1

Ultimate Pack
The Ultimate Pack includes all four 'skinny' channel packs: Kids, Knowledge, Vibe, and Variety.

Note: 1 These channels are exclusively available through Fetch TV in Australia.2 This channel is a different version to the one provided by the Seven Network on free-to-air television until December 2019.3 Content from this channel is available on demand.

Special interest packs
As of December 2020 the following channels are offered through the Fetch TV Special Interest Packs:
BeIN Sports 1,2 & 3 in HD
Australian Christian Channel & TBN Inspire (open access without cost)
Horse & Country TV1
Optus Sports 1-6 HD1
Fetch offers UFC pay-per-view fights at $54.95 AUD per event.

Note: 1 These channels are exclusively available through Fetch TV in Australia.

Former channels
Cartoon Network - Channel closed on 22/04/2021
Boomerang - Channel closed on 22/04/2021
CNN International Channel closed on 22/04/2021
CGTN Channel closed on 31/7/2021
Fox Sports News (replaced by TVH!TS)
Discovery Home & Health
Deutsche Welle
Ovation
Garage1 - Channel closed on 31/07/2017
Nat Geo People3 - Channel closed on 28/02/2018
Disney Channel - Ended 30/04/2020
Disney Junior - Ended 30/04/2020
Disney XD - Ended 06/01/2019
TVH!TS Ended on Fetch TV 31/12/2018, continued only on Foxtel rebranded later on from 11/11/2019 as Fox Crime
111 Funny Ended on Fetch TV 31/12/2018, continued only on Foxtel rebranded later on from 11/11/2019 as Fox Funny
Style Network Ended 17/12/2019
13th Street Ended on Fetch TV 31/12/2019 continued only on Foxtel rebranded later on as Fox Sleuth
Syfy Ended on Fetch TV 31/12/2019 continued only on Foxtel rebranded later on as Fox Sci-Fi
Spike1 Channel closed on 27/2/2022

Ultimate Pack channel list

Note: 1 These channels are exclusively available through Fetch TV in Australia.2 This channel is a different version to the one provided by the Seven Network on free-to-air television until December 2019.

World language channels

Italian  package
4 Channels.
Rai News 241
Rai World Premium1
Rai Italia
Mediaset Italia1

Pinoy TV package
8 Channels.
Aksyon International
DWLS - Audio
DZBB - Audio
GMA Life TV
GMA News TV
GMA Pinoy TV
Kapatid TV5
Viva TV

TVB Cantonese & Korean package
4 Channels.
KBS World
TVB Jade
TVBE News
TVBN

Taj Mahal (Indian and Pakistani) package
23 Channels.

Apps
Fetch boxes receive the following apps

Note: 1 Appears in 'Catch Up' menu.2 Appears in 'TV' menu.

See also

Internet television in Australia
Subscription television in Australia

References

External links

Australian subscription television services
Mass media companies of Australia
Entertainment companies of Australia
Companies based in Sydney
2010 establishments in Australia
Mass media companies established in 2010